Lafofa, also Tegem–Amira, is a dialect cluster spoken in the southern Nuba Mountains in the south of Sudan. Blench (2010) considers the Tegem and Amira varieties to be distinct languages; as Lafofa is poorly attested, there may be others. 

Greenberg (1950) classified Lafofa as one of the Talodi languages, albeit a divergent one, but without much evidence. More recently this position has been abandoned, and Lafofa is left unclassified within Niger–Congo. Norton (2016) tentatively finds Lafofa to be closest to the Ijoid languages. It is considered a language isolate by Glottolog. 

Unlike the neighbouring Talodi-Heiban languages which have SVO word order, the Lafofa languages have SOV word order.

See also
Lafofa word lists (Wiktionary)

References

Roger Blench, 2011 (ms), "Does Kordofanian constitute a group and if not, where does its languages fit into Niger-Congo?"
Roger Blench, 2011 (ms), "Tegem–Amira: a previously unrecognised subgroup of Niger–Congo"

 
Kordofanian languages
Language families
Severely endangered languages